Governor Collins may refer to:

John Collins (Continental Congress) (1717–1795), 3rd Governor of Rhode Island
John Collins (governor) (1776–1822), 22nd Governor of Delaware
LeRoy Collins (1909–1991), 33rd Governor of Florida
Martha Layne Collins (born 1936), 56th Governor of Kentucky
Thomas Collins (governor) (1732–1789), 8th President of Delaware